Necoclí is a town and municipality in Antioquia Department, Colombia. It is on the eastern shore of the Gulf of Urabá. Its population is predominantly Afro-Colombian, Black descendants of former slaves.

It was founded as a Spanish city called San Sebastián de Buena Vista. One of Colombia's oldest towns, it was founded in 1509 by Pedro de Heredia, who died in 1555.

Some early reports of the town can be found in chapter 9 of Pedro Cieza de León's Crónica del Perú (1553).

Necoclí Airport is a general aviation airport, without scheduled flights. Buses link the town with Cartagena, the department capital of Medellín, and other points. There are scheduled launches to two towns without road access, Capurganá and Acandí, across the gulf and near the Panamanian border.

2021 deluge of Haitian migrants
The town is as close to Panama as one can get by road from the south, and serves as an impromptu staging ground for migrants attempting to cross the Gulf of Urabá to Capurganá, and from there by hiking through the Darién Gap into Panama, en route to the United States. While the population of Necoclí is about 20,000, about 25,000 migrants, 75% of which were Haitian, passed through Necoclí between January and August, 2021. The number of migrants arriving exceeded the capacity of the ferries across the Gulf of Urabá, causing extended waits for a free seat. In August 2021 there were some 10,000 migrants sleeping in hostels, churches, or on the beach. The town's water system collapsed, unable to handle the increased load. The mayor proclaimed a state of emergency ("calamidad pública").

Climate
Necoclí has a tropical monsoon climate (Am)What is this an abbreviation for?  with moderate rainfall from January to March and heavy rainfall in the remaining months.

See also
 Acandí
 Capurganá

References

Further reading
 

Municipalities of Antioquia Department
Populated places established in 1509
1509 establishments in the Spanish Empire